Zora Brziaková (born 14 March 1964) is a Slovak basketball player. She competed in the women's tournament at the 1988 Summer Olympics.

References

1964 births
Living people
Slovak women's basketball players
Olympic basketball players of Czechoslovakia
Basketball players at the 1988 Summer Olympics
Sportspeople from Košice